The women's 4 x 100 metres relay event at the 2002 Commonwealth Games was held on July 31.

Results

References
Official results
Results at BBC

Relay
2002
2002 in women's athletics